The Bodil Award for Best American Film is one of the categories for the Bodil Awards presented annually by the Danish Union of Film Critics. It was created in 1948 and is one of the oldest film prizes in Europe. The category was named "Best American Film" until 1961, when it became the "Best Non-European Film". In 2001, the name of the award changed back to "Best American Film", and the European category was changed to "Best Non-American Film".

The judging committee may choose not to present an award if there isn't a worthy film. This has happened twice: In 1957, when American producers boycotted Denmark; and in 1964, when two Bodils were awarded to European films.

Honorees

1940s 
 1948: The Best Years of Our Lives directed by William Wyler
 1949: Monsieur Verdoux directed by Charles Chaplin

1950s 
 1950: The Snake Pit directed by Anatole Litvak
 1951: Sunset Boulevard directed by Billy Wilder
 1952: All About Eve directed by Joseph L. Mankiewicz
 1953: High Noon directed by Fred Zinnemann
 1954: Julius Caesar by  Joseph L. Mankiewicz
 1955: On the Waterfront directed by Elia Kazan
 1956: Marty directed by Delbert Mann
 1957: Not awarded
 1958: East of Eden directed by Elia Kazan
 1959: The Defiant Ones directed by Stanley Kramer

1960s 
 1960: 12 Angry Men directed by Sidney Lumet
 1961: The Young One directed by Luis Buñuel
 1962: Judgment at Nuremberg directed by Stanley Kramer
 1963: The Exterminating Angel directed by Luis Buñuel
 1964: Not awarded
 1965: Seven Days in May directed by John Frankenheimer
 1966: The Pawnbroker directed by Sidney Lumet
 1967: Aparajito directed by Satyajit Ray
 1968: Bonnie and Clyde directed by Arthur Penn
 1969: Pather Panchali directed by Satyajit Ray

1970s 
 1970: Midnight Cowboy directed by John Schlesinger
 1971: Tell Them Willie Boy Is Here directed by Abraham Polonsky
 1972: Taking Off directed by Miloš Forman
 1973: Cabaret directed by Bob Fosse
 1974: Scarecrow directed by Jerry Schatzberg
 1975: Chinatown directed by Roman Polanski
 1976: One Flew Over the Cuckoo's Nest directed by Miloš Forman
 1977: Nashville directed by Robert Altman
 1978: Annie Hall directed by Woody Allen
 1979: An Unmarried Woman directed by Paul Mazursky

1980s 
 1980: Manhattan directed by Woody Allen
 1981: All That Jazz directed by Bob Fosse
 1982: The Four Seasons directed by Alan Alda
 1983: Tootsie directed by Sydney Pollack
 1984: Zelig directed by Woody Allen
 1985: The Right Stuff directed by Philip Kaufman
 1986: The Purple Rose of Cairo directed by Woody Allen
 1987: Hannah and Her Sisters directed by Woody Allen
 1988: Down by Law directed by Jim Jarmusch
 1989: The Dead directed by John Huston

1990s 
 1990: Dangerous Liaisons directed by Stephen Frears
 1991: Goodfellas directed by Martin Scorsese
 1992: Thelma & Louise directed by Ridley Scott
 1993: The Player directed by Robert Altman
 1994: The Age of Innocence directed by Martin Scorsese and The Piano directed by Jane Campion
 1995: Short Cuts directed by Robert Altman
 1996: Smoke directed by Wayne Wang
 1997: Fargo directed by Joel Coen
 1998: L.A. Confidential directed by Curtis Hanson
 1999: The Ice Storm directed by Ang Lee

2000s 
 2000: The Straight Story directed by David Lynch
 2001: American Beauty directed by Sam Mendes
 2002: The Lord of the Rings: The Fellowship of the Ring directed by Peter Jackson
 2003: Mulholland Drive directed by David Lynch
 2004: Bowling for Columbine directed by Michael Moore
 2005: Lost in Translation directed by Sofia Coppola
 2006: A History of Violence directed by David Cronenberg
 2007: Babel directed by Alejandro González Iñárritu
 2008: Letters from Iwo Jima directed by Clint Eastwood
 2009: There Will Be Blood directed by Paul Thomas Anderson

2010s 
 2010: Up directed by Pete Docter
 2011: A Single Man directed by Tom Ford
 2012: Winter's Bone directed by Debra Granik
 2013: Martha Marcy May Marlene directed by Sean Durkin
 2014: Beasts of the Southern Wild directed by Benh Zeitlin
 2015: Boyhood directed by Richard Linklater
 2016: Birdman directed by Alejandro González Iñárritu
 2017: The Revenant directed by Alejandro González Iñárritu
 2018: La La Land directed by Damien Chazelle
 2019: The Florida Project directed by Sean S. Baker

2020s 
 2020: Marriage Story directed by Noah Baumbach
 2021: The Lighthouse directed by Robert Eggers

See also 

 Robert Award for Best American Film

References

Sources

Further reading

External links 
  

1948 establishments in Denmark
Awards established in 1948
Awards for best film
American
Lists of films by award